Lynx Ridge is a residential subdivision in the northwest quadrant of Calgary, Alberta. It is located at the extreme western edge of the city, bordered on the east by Twelve Mile Coulee Road and to the south by the Bow River. Its northern and western boundaries are the city limits and rural residential development within the area of Bearspaw. The subdivision covers 88 hectares and the Lynx Ridge Golf Club winds its way through the neighbourhood. The subdivision was established in the Municipal District of Rocky View in the late-1990s/early-2000s, and was annexed into the City of Calgary on January 1, 2005.

It is represented in the Calgary City Council by Ward 1 councillor.

Infrastructure 
Save for the golf course, there is no commercial hub in Lynx Ridge, with the closest commercial services in Rocky Ridge and Tuscany. The area is not presently served by Calgary Transit, nor has space been set aside for schools, due to its small size. The golf course provides most of the subdivision's green space.

See also 
List of neighbourhoods in Calgary

References

External links 
Calgary Planning Commission, June 30, 2005

Neighbourhoods in Calgary